This article contains the results of the Tipperary county hurling team in the Championship during the 1990s.

Tipperary played 27 Championship games during the decade, winning 14, losing 10, and drawing 3. They won 2 Munster titles in 1991 and 1993 and won 1 All Ireland title in 1991.

1990

1991

1992

1993

1994

1995

1996

1997

1998

1999

References

External links
Tipperary GAA Fan site
Tipperary on Hoganstand.com
Tipperary GAA site
Premierview
Tipperary GAA Archives

1990 in hurling
1991 in hurling
1992 in hurling
1993 in hurling
1994 in hurling
1995 in hurling
1996 in hurling
1997 in hurling
1998 in hurling
1999 in hurling
9